The Sukari mine or Alsukari mine (Arabic: السكري Al-Sukkari, Egyptian pronunciation: El-Sokkari) is a gold mine located in the Nubian Desert/Eastern Desert near the Red Sea in Egypt, in the south-east of the country in the Red Sea Governorate, 30 km south of Marsa Alam. It is exploited jointly by the Egyptian Ministry of Mineral Resources and Centamin. It is Egypt's first modern gold mine, an industry considered to have scope for expansion in the country. Egypt was known in the ancient world as being a source of gold, and one of the earliest available maps shows a gold mine at this location.

It is a combination of an open-pit mine and an underground mine, with estimated reserves of 15.4 million ounces of gold. The site is supplied by a 30 km long pipeline bringing water from the Red Sea.

History 
The $265-million project began gold production in 2009 with 850 workers. The initial yield was 2 g/t, with future yields expected to rise to between 5 g/t and 10 g/t.

In October 2012 Centamin's licence for the Sukarim mine was annulled by an Egyptian court, and in December operations were suspended over a payment dispute and exports halted. Within a week significant parts of the dispute with the Egyptian state were resolved and exports were resumed.

By 2014 production had risen to 250,000 ounces in the first nine months, with a target figure for the entire year of 420,000 ounces.

References

Gold mines in Egypt
Open-pit mines